Kristi Brooks is the author of Vision², a science fiction novel, various short stories, and columns for local publications.  She is noted for her blending of genres, often merging elements of sci-fi, fantasy, and horror in her stories. The way Vision² presents human/alien interaction has been compared to the Ender series by Orson Scott Card. "Kristi Brooks' first book presents a vibrant style of writing that keeps the reader turning pages." — Robert O'Hern, "Book Briefs," The Daily Oklahoman, 6 July 2005.

Born in Southwestern Oklahoma in 1980, Brooks began writing early. She was enthralled by horror stories at a young age, and she was especially taken by the early novels of Stephen King.

She was first published in small anthologies before selling her first novel to PegLeg Publishing, an independent publisher in Oklahoma City.  Brooks received her BA in English and her MLA from Oklahoma City University.  She currently lives in Oklahoma City with her husband and menagerie of animals.

Bibliography
 Fantasies: An Anthology of World's Great Short Stories
 The Mangum Star, "Fried Rattlesnake" (April 2005)
 Absolute Anthology, "Chasing Storms" (2006)
 
 
 
 
 GlassFire Anthology (co-editor) (2007)
 Florilegium (co-editor) (2009) 
 "String Theories" Aoife's Kiss (September 2010 Issue)
 Entrances & Exits (contributor, co-editor) (2013)
 
 "Lena's Confession". Niteblade Magazine. September 2014
 "Fine Print" Acidic Fiction Ezine. 5 January 2015
 "Grains of Galaxies" 10 January 2016
 "Normalcy" Unleashing the Voices Within Stitched Smile Publications 22 June 2016
 "Midnight Sun: The Anastomosis Series Book 1" PegLeg Publishing. 30 November 2016
 "The Price" PegLeg Publishing. 27 January 2017
Midday Moon: The Anastomosis Series Book 2 PegLeg Publishing. 26 October 2019

See also
List of horror fiction authors

References

21st-century American novelists
American horror writers
American science fiction writers
American women short story writers
American women novelists
Oklahoma City University alumni
1980 births
Living people
Women science fiction and fantasy writers
Women horror writers
21st-century American women writers
21st-century American short story writers